James Dupree Henry (January 17, 1950 – September 20, 1984) was an American criminal who was executed in Florida for the murder of civil rights leader Zellie Riley. Henry slashed Riley's throat during a robbery in Orlando on March 23, 1974. He also shot and almost killed Orlando detective Ronald E. Ferguson during his arrest five days later. Notably, despite killing a civil rights leader, other civil rights leaders, namely Jesse Jackson and Coretta Scott King, attempted to stop Henry's execution. William Riley, Zellie Riley's son, also stated he did not want his father's killer to be executed. On September 20, 1984, Henry was executed via the electric chair.

Early life 

James Dupree Henry was born in Orlando on January 17, 1950. Growing up, he shifted among family members, and in later years said he was unsure as to whether or not he had any siblings. It was not until his murder conviction that he met his real mother. In 1965, when Henry was 15 years old, he stabbed a 19-year-old man in Orlando's west side. He claimed the man was trying to rob him, but nevertheless Henry was forced to be housed at a boy's reformatory in Marianna, Florida, for a few months. 

Henry was re-arrested in 1970, at age 20, for shooting and critically wounding a man. Once again Henry claimed it was self-defense, but the man said Henry tried to rob him. In jail, he was accused of attacking a jail supervisor. In 1973, Henry took part in a prison fight, during which he suffered a knife wound to his left eye, causing him to permanently lose sight in that eye. Later that year Henry was released from prison.

Victim 

Zellie L. "Z. L." Riley (April 1, 1892 – March 23, 1974) was a prominent civil rights leader in Orlando. Born in Georgia in 1892, he moved to the Orlando area in 1920, and became a member of the Mount Olive A.M.E. Church. In 1950, he founded the Orlando Negro Chamber of Commerce (now known as the African American Chamber of Commerce). In 1957, he was promoted as the chairman of the Negro division for the United Appeal campaign. He also was behind several other projects to alter the view of African Americans of Orlando, such as a community center in Washington Shores. After his death, Z.L. Riley Park was opened in the neighborhood of Parramore.

Murder 

On Saturday, March 23, 1974, Henry broke into Riley's home at 422 Sunset Avenue. Henry, who had planned a robbery, attacked Riley, who was 81 years old at the time. Henry bound Riley, gagged him, slashed his throat open with a razor, then viciously beat him with his fists and a gun until he was sure Riley was dead. Afterwards he scoured around the house and stole multiple valuables. He also took $64 of Riley's personal money. 

The following day, Sunday, March 24, Riley was expected to attend church with his nephew, but did not show up. In a welfare check on his home, police found his body. Carl T. Langford, the mayor of Orlando during this time, spoke to the Orlando Sentinel on March 25. He said "I've known Mr. Riley nearly 30 years. He was always concerned about Orlando and the people of Orlando, and, in his quiet, gentle way, he worked to bring about better conditions in the section where he lived and better understanding between segments of the community". A reward fund was started on March 26 to locate the killer. Riley was buried at Washington Park Cemetery. Henry was identified as the killer due leaving his fingerprints at the crime scene.

On March 28, 1974, Ronald Eugene Ferguson, an award-winning Orlando detective, approached Henry to question him about the murder. When told he was going to get arrested, Henry attacked Ferguson and stole his gun. He then demanded Ferguson to get away from him. When Ferguson said no Henry shot him once in the upper chest and the lower right abdomen. He then continued to beat him until backup arrived, and Henry was arrested. Ferguson was rushed to the hospital where he was treated for critical injuries. Ferguson ended up making a full recovery.

Incarceration 

In June 1974, a 12-member jury found Henry guilty of first-degree murder and sentenced him to death days later. He was housed at Florida State Prison to await his execution. He was first scheduled to be executed on December 6, 1979, after Florida governor Bob Graham signed to approve the execution. When it was publicly announced that Henry was going to die, Riley's own son William, a taxi service owner in Orlando, publicly stated that his father loved peace and despised vengeance. William said he did not want Henry to be executed, and also said that his father would not want him executed either; "This is not the way, a life for a life. My father taught me God gave life and only God can take life. We suffered as a family when he died, and we ask you not to add to our suffering by killing James Dupree Henry". 

Seven days before Henry was scheduled to be executed, Justice John Reed ordered to stop the execution due to an investigation on whether or not capital punishment was disproportionately used in Orange County. In 1981, a federal court ruled that Henry would have to be re-sentenced by a new jury. This was due to the testimony of Ferguson in Henry's trial, which the court ruled should not have been allowed. However, this never ended up happening and Henry remained on death row.

Execution 
In 1984, Governor Graham delayed Henry's September 19 execution, rescheduling it to the next day. That same day he also delayed the execution of Aubrey Adams Jr., who was on death row for killing an 8-year-old in 1978. In September 1984, Graham received letters from civil rights advocates Jesse Jackson and Coretta Scott King, begging the governor to grant clemency for Henry. In the letters both were convinced Henry's conviction was racially motivated. In response Governor Graham met with Jackson and the two held a private 20-minute meeting. Jackson presented Graham a note King written which stated, "it saddens me to learn that the state of Florida is about to execute Mr. Henry despite the pleas of the victim's family and his community". 

Nevertheless, Graham stated Jackson and King did not change his mind about Henry, and that the execution was going to take place. On September 20, Henry ate his final meal which consisted of a dozen oysters mixed with hot sauce and crackers. In his final statement to the media, Henry stated that he felt innocent; "My final words are, I am innocent". Following that, at 7 a.m., Henry was executed by the electric chair.

See also 
 List of people executed in Florida

References 

1950 births
1974 murders in the United States
1984 deaths
20th-century African-American people
20th-century American criminals
20th-century executions by Florida
20th-century executions of American people
American male criminals
American people executed for murder
Executed people from Florida
Executed African-American people
People convicted of murder by Florida
People executed by Florida by electric chair